Elias Harris (born 6 July 1989) is a German professional basketball player for Bayern Munich of the Bundesliga (BBL) and the EuroLeague. He played college basketball at Gonzaga University and plays for the German national team.

Junior career
Harris was one of the top junior players in Germany when he graduated from Friedrich-Magnus-Schwerd-Gymnasium in his hometown of Speyer, Germany. As a German junior, he spent four years playing for BIS Speyer in the German Pro B third division for four years, averaging 20.9 ppg and 9.2 rpg in 2008–09. He also competed with the German national junior basketball team at the 2005 FIBA Europe Under-16 Championship; 2006 and 2007 FIBA Europe Under-18 Championship; and 2008 and 2009 FIBA Europe Under-20 Championship.

College career

Harris committed to NCAA Division I squad Gonzaga University prior to the 2009–10 season. He immediately saw action with the Bulldogs despite being a freshman; in his second game of the season, against powerhouse #2-ranked Michigan State University, he scored a team-high 17 points and grabbed a team-high 9 rebounds in a narrow 75–71 loss.

Professional career
After going undrafted in the 2013 NBA draft, Harris joined the Los Angeles Lakers for the 2013 NBA Summer League. He finished the summer league with averages of 10.2 points and 5.6 rebounds. On 14 August 2013, he signed a multi-year deal with the Lakers. During his rookie season, he had multiple assignments with the Los Angeles D-Fenders. On 29 November 2013, he was waived by the Lakers.

On 13 December 2013, he signed a two-year deal with Brose Bamberg of Germany and in April 2015 had his contract extended through the 2016–17 season. In March 2017, Harris signed a new deal with the Bamberg side, which kept him with the club until 2020.

In July 2014, Harris joined the Phoenix Suns for the 2014 NBA Summer League. In 2020, he did not have his contract renewed by the Bamberg team. During his seven years with the team, Harris won three German championships and two German Cup titles. He served as team captain.

On 23 September 2020, Harris signed with Riesen Ludwigsburg of the Basketball Bundesliga.

On 3 January 2021, he signed with Basket Zaragoza of the Liga ACB.

On July 12, 2022, he has signed with Bayern Munich of the Bundesliga (BBL).

International career
Harris made his debut with the senior German national basketball team at the EuroBasket 2009. Although he was the second-youngest player on the team, he averaged 12 minutes per game while seeing action in all six games for the German squad.

Personal life
Elias's father Mike is an African American former professional player who played basketball in Germany while his mother Svenja is a former Germany women's national basketball team player.

References

External links
 Profile at Realgm.com
 Profile at Eurobasket.com
 Profile at Euroleague.net
 Gonzaga Bulldogs bio

1989 births
Living people
2010 FIBA World Championship players
American men's basketball players
Basket Zaragoza players
Brose Bamberg players
FC Bayern Munich basketball players
German expatriate basketball people in Spain
German men's basketball players
German people of African-American descent
German people of American descent
Gonzaga Bulldogs men's basketball players
Liga ACB players
Los Angeles D-Fenders players
Los Angeles Lakers players
National Basketball Association players from Germany
People from Speyer
Power forwards (basketball)
Riesen Ludwigsburg players
Small forwards
Sportspeople from Rhineland-Palatinate
Undrafted National Basketball Association players